California Proposition 53 may refer to:

 California Proposition 53 (2003)
 California Proposition 53 (2016)